Niklas Birger Thor (born 21 February 1986) is a Swedish footballer who plays as a midfielder. He was commonly known as Niklas Thor or, during his marriage to a famous Swedish politician Ebba Busch, Niklas Busch Thor.

Career
Thor took a football high school program at Ebersteinska gymnasiet in Norrköping, Östergötland County. During his time in high school, Thor played for IFK Norrköping and IF Sylvia. After graduating high school, he moved to Uppsala, Uppsala County where he played for his mother club Storvreta IK. Seven years later, in late 2013, he signed a two-year deal with IK Sirius in Sweden's second highest league, Superettan. On 25 May 2021, Thor joined Hammarby TFF.

Personal life 
Thor married Swedish politician Ebba Busch Thor in 2013: they used the common name of Busch Thor. Thor and Busch filed for divorce in December 2019. They have a son, Birger, born in May 2015 and a daughter, Elise, born in February 2017. Ebba Busch Thor was elected Leader of the Christian Democrats in April 2015 and is now the youngest party leader of all major parties.

Besides football, Thor studies engineering at the Royal Institute of Technology.

References

External links 
 
 
 
 

1986 births
Living people
Swedish footballers
IK Frej players
IK Sirius Fotboll players
Hammarby Talang FF players
Superettan players
Allsvenskan players
Association football midfielders